Hellinsia aguilerai is a moth of the family Pterophoridae. It is found in Ecuador.

The wingspan is 23 mm. The forewings are grey-brown. The hindwings and fringes are brown-grey. Adults are on wing in December, at an altitude of 2,650 m.

Etymology
The species is named after President Jaime Roldos Aguilera from Ecuador, who died in an airplane accident in 1981.

References

Moths described in 2011
aguilerai
Moths of South America